Ross McCrorie (born 18 March 1998) is a Scottish professional footballer who plays as a centre-back or defensive midfielder for Scottish Premiership side Aberdeen.

McCrorie has previously played for Rangers, Ayr United, Dumbarton and Portsmouth. He has also captained the Scotland under-21 team.

Club career

Early careers and loans out
McCrorie, alongside his twin brother Robby (a goalkeeper), worked his way through the Rangers youth system, becoming captain of their U20s side. McCrorie joined Scottish League One side Ayr United on loan in February 2016, playing fifteen times and scoring twice as Ayr won promotion.

After signing a new contract in December 2016, at the same time as his brother, he joined his former coach at Rangers, Ian Durrant, at Scottish Championship side Dumbarton  on a loan deal until the end of the season.

Rangers first breakthrough
McCrorie made his debut for the Rangers senior team in September 2017, when he replaced Bruno Alves in a League Cup quarter-final against Partick Thistle at Firhill Stadium, won 3–1 after extra time. Following the match, manager Pedro Caixinha praised McCrorie, stating that he was "going to be the future of this country, not only this club, as a centre-half. We are very glad to have him with us". Later in the same week he made his first start – also his Scottish Premiership debut and maiden experience of the Old Firm derby – against Celtic at Ibrox. Rangers lost the match 2–0, but McCrorie's performance was reported favourably by the press and both Rangers and Celtic fans.

McCrorie scored his first senior goal for Rangers with a header in the first half against Partick Thistle on 4 November 2017 at Ibrox; Rangers won the match 3–0. On 3 December he was deployed as a defensive midfielder in a fixture away to Aberdeen, which his team won to overtake their opponents into second place in the table. On 28 December he signed a new four-year contract. After he scored an important goal in the second visit to Aberdeen in May 2018, McCrorie received praise from both the Pittodrie boss Derek McInnes and the Rangers caretaker manager Jimmy Nicholl for his overall performance and influence in bringing his team back into the match; the player himself dedicated the strike to his dying grandmother.

Loan to Portsmouth
In July 2019, McCrorie agreed a deal to move to English club Portsmouth on loan for the 2019–20 season; it was reported that Pompey had an option to buy him outright, but this was refuted by Rangers manager Steven Gerrard a few days later. He made his competitive debut for Pompey on 3 August, a 1–0 defeat away at Shrewsbury Town, during which he was sent off in the 81st minute for a late challenge on Shrewsbury's Donald Love.

Aberdeen
On 17 August 2020, McCrorie joined Aberdeen, initially on a one-year loan due to short-term cash flow issues at his new club, with an obligation to buy for a reported fee of around £350,000. A clause in the deal meant he would not be eligible to play against his 'parent club' during the 2020–21 Scottish Premiership campaign, although he would not return to Rangers before becoming a permanent Aberdeen signing. The deal was made permanent on 1 February 2021, ahead of schedule, as Scott Wright moved in the opposite direction.

International career
With his brother Robby, Scotland U16 won the Victory Shield in 2013–14, and were selected for Scotland U17 in the 2015 UEFA European U-17 Championship

McCrorie was named in the Scotland U19 squad for the elite round of the European Championships in March 2017 alongside Dumbarton teammate Daniel Harvie. He had captained the side in the qualifying phase of the tournament. He also captained the Scotland U21 team on several occasions.

Selected for the under-20 squad in the 2017 Toulon Tournament. The team went on to claim the bronze medal. It was the nations first ever medal at the competition.

Career statistics

Honours 
Ayr United
Scottish Championship Play-offs: 2015–16

Scotland U16
Victory Shield: 2013–14

References

External links

1998 births
Living people
Scottish footballers
Scottish twins
Twin sportspeople
Footballers from South Ayrshire
Association football defenders
Association football midfielders
Scotland youth international footballers
Dumbarton F.C. players
Rangers F.C. players
Portsmouth F.C. players
Scottish Professional Football League players
Ayr United F.C. players
Scotland under-21 international footballers
Outfield association footballers who played in goal
Aberdeen F.C. players